Hose's langur (Presbytis hosei) is a species of primate in the family Cercopithecidae endemic to the island of Borneo, including Brunei, Kalimantan (Indonesia), and East Malaysia. Its natural habitat is subtropical or tropical dry forests. It is threatened by habitat loss. It was first identified in Kutai National Park and Sangkulirang Peninsula, East Kalimantan, Indonesia, in 1985.

Miller's langur (P. canicrus) and the Saban grizzled langur (P. sabana) were previously considered subspecies of Hose's langur.  There used to also be two additional forms that were considered separate subspecies, P. h. hosei and P. h. everetti.  However, P. h. everetti is no longer considered to be a separate subspecies as the original identification of it as a separate subspecies appears to be the result of comparing a subadult female with an adult male.

Threatened extinction
In 1996, Hose's langurs of East Kalimantan, Indonesia, were among the most common primates in the area. In 2003, their population densities  have decreased by 50–80%. The sudden drop in population arises from the rising demand for its bezoar stones and to prevent crop raiding, and the rapid deforestation and removal of the primate's habitat.

Densities of Hose's langurs positively correlate with tree height, height of the first bough, tree diameter, and canopy cover, and negatively with vegetation cover at low and ground level. With the constant deforestation and destruction of its habitat, Hose's langurs continue to lose their habitat. Every known area in which the primate resides has been affected severely, with the exception of the innermost areas of forests that have been relatively untouched by humans.

References

External links 
 ARKive – images and movies of Hose's langur (Presbytis hosei)

Presbytis
Endemic fauna of Borneo
Mammals of Borneo
Mammals of Brunei
Primates of Indonesia
Mammals of Malaysia
Mammals described in 1889
Taxonomy articles created by Polbot
Taxa named by Oldfield Thomas
Vulnerable fauna of Asia